Sivamani is a 2003 Indian Telugu-language romantic action film written, directed and produced by Puri Jagannadh on Vaishno Academy banner. The film stars Nagarjuna Akkineni, Rakshitha, Asin and Prakash Raj. It has music composed by Chakri. A part of the story has been taken from the movie Message in a Bottle released in 1999 which in turn was inspired by Message in a Bottle - the Nicholas Sparks novel.

Plot 

Pallavi, a newspaper editor, finds a mysterious, intriguing, and typed love letter in a bottle in the seashore. She is fascinated by it and shows it to her colleagues. They print it in their newspaper and get numerous responses. Pallavi, due to her personal curiosity, tries to reach Sivamani, and he ignores her. Rajnikanth helps Pallavi in getting close to Sivamani, and later Sivamani's past gets revealed. Sivamani is an honest cop in Visakhapatnam (Vizag). He falls in love with Vasanta, who aspires to become a singer. Dattu is a mafia don, whom Sivamani troubles a lot.

Incidentally, Vasanta is distantly related to Dattu, and both of them belong to Kerala. In the course of events, Sivamani's mother gets paralyzed. Sivamani and Vasanta take her to Kerala to get the state's Ayurveda treatments. Dattu is also in Kerala, and his mission is to get his revenge by taking Vasanta away from Sivamani. Vasanta becomes mute after Dattu punctures her voice box. The rest of the story is about how Sivamani gets Vasanta back with Pallavi's help.

Cast 

 Nagarjuna Akkineni as CI Sivamani
 Rakshitha as Pallavi
 Asin as Vasanta
 Prakash Raj as Dattu
 Sangeetha as Sivamani's mother
 Mohan Raj as Vasanta's father
 Ali as Rajnikanth
 Banerjee as ACP
 Vinod Bala as Dattu's henchman
 Brahmaji  as Dattu's henchman
 M. S. Narayana as Sheikh Imam's client
 AVS as Pallavi's boss
 Bandla Ganesh as person who keeps calling M. S. Narayana
 Besant Ravi
 Ooma
 Nisha

Soundtrack

Music was composed by Chakri. Music was released on SOHAN Audio Company.

Reception 
Sify gave the film a verdict of 'let down' and opined that "The much hyped Sivamani-9848022338 is a kichidi that neither pleases the classes nor the masses". Jeevi of Idlebrain wrote that "You can watch this film for Nagarjuna and the cool flashback episode of the first half". Mithun Verma of Full Hyderabad wrote that "But overall, Puri has paid too much attention to untimely gimmicks and tried to cram in everything possible into Shivamani".

The dialogue of the character Sivamani "Na peru Shivamani, nakkonchem mental" became popular during the early 2000s.

Awards
M. S. Narayana won Nandi Award for Best Male Comedian for this film.

Legal issues 
A legal suit was filed by an individual who owns the phone number alleging that the makers of the film did not attain his permission to use the phone number in the film. He alleged that he received calls from people in the hopes of speaking to Nagarjuna, and that it had caused him "immense agony".

Legacy 
In April 2020, during the lockdown because of the COVID-19 pandemic in India, a short video from the film was shared by Nagarjuna, in which the dialogues of Sivamani were mimicked and replaced, with a warning to the goons of not wearing masks and asks them to wear masks and maintain social distance.

References

External links
 

2003 films
2000s romantic action films
Indian romantic action films
Films directed by Puri Jagannadh
Films about organised crime in India
2000s Telugu-language films
Films shot in Visakhapatnam
Films set in Visakhapatnam
Films shot in Andhra Pradesh
Films set in Andhra Pradesh
Films scored by Chakri